Michael Halpin is a Democratic member of the Illinois House of Representatives representing the 72nd district. The 72nd district is located in the Quad Cities and includes East Moline, Moline, Rock Island, Milan, Taylor Ridge and Andalusia. He first took office in January 2017.

Early life and career
On July 8, 2013, Governor Pat Quinn appointed Halpin to succeed Linnea E. Thompson as the Public Administrator and Public Guardian for Rock Island County for a term starting June 20, 2013 and ending December 2, 2013. Halpin was confirmed by the Illinois Senate on November 13, 2013. Halpin was appointed and confirmed for a second term starting December 23, 2013 and ending December 4, 2017.

Illinois General Assembly
As of July 3, 2022, Representative Halpin is a member of the following Illinois House committees:

 Agriculture & Conservation Committee (HAGC)
 Appropriations - General Service Committee (HAPG)
 (Chairman of) Personnel & Pension Committee (HPPN)
 Veterans' Affairs Committee (HVET)

Halpin is a legislative member of the Midwest Interstate Passenger Rail Commission. The commission is composed of representatives from four states to promote development and implementation of improvements to intercity passenger rail service in the Midwest and to develop long-range plans for high speed rail passenger service in the Midwest and other regions of the country.

In 2018, Democrat J.B. Pritzker appointed Halpin, an attorney, a member of the gubernatorial transition's Job Creation and Economic Opportunity Committee.

References

External links
 Profile at Illinois General Assembly

21st-century American politicians
Living people
Year of birth missing (living people)
Roger Williams University alumni
University of Illinois College of Law alumni
Democratic Party members of the Illinois House of Representatives
People from Voorheesville, New York
People from East Moline, Illinois